Tariana may refer to:
 Tariana people, an ethnic group of Brazil and Colombia
 Tariana language, an Arawakan language
 Tariana Turia (born 1944), New Zealand politician

See also 
 Taryana, an ancient Iranian city